Team Nürnberger was a German road cycling team that competed professionally between 1996 and 2002.

Major wins
1996
 Acht van Chaam, Mike Weissmann
1999
 Overall Hessen-Rundfahrt, Jens Zemke (1999)
 Overall Sachsen-Tour, Jörn Reuß
 Rund um die Nürnberger Altstadt, Jens Zemke
2000
 Overall Sachsen-Tour, Thomas Liese
 Rund um die Nürnberger Altstadt, Raphael Schweda
 Rund um Düren, Jürgen Werner
2001
 Beverbeek Classic, Koen Das
2002
 Rund um Düren, Lubor Tesař

References

Defunct cycling teams based in Germany
Cycling teams based in Germany
Cycling teams established in 1996
Cycling teams disestablished in 2002